Qaleh-ye Esmail Aqa (also Romanized as Qal‘eh-ye Esmā‘īl Āqā and Qal‘eh-ye Esmā‘īlāqā; also known as Esmā‘īlāqā Qal‘ehsī) is a village in Nazluchay Rural District, Nazlu District, Urmia County, West Azerbaijan Province, Iran. At the 2006 census, its population was 897, in 140 families.

References 

Populated places in Urmia County